Ecsenius minutus is a species of combtooth blenny in the genus Ecsenius. It is found in coral reefs in Maldives, in the western Indian ocean. It can reach a maximum length of 4 centimetres. Blennies in this species feed primarily off of plants, including benthic algae and weeds, and are commercial aquarium fish.

References
 Klausewitz, W., 1963 (30 Oct.) Ecsenius minutus n. sp. von den Malediven (Pisces, Salariidae). Senckenbergiana Biologica v. 44 (no. 5): 357–358.

minutus
Fish described in 1963
Taxa named by Wolfgang Klausewitz
Endemic fauna of the Maldives